Bandol may refer to:
Bandol, France
Bandol wine
Bandol (instrument)
Bandul, Iran
Bandul, Travnik - see list of populated places in Bosnia and Herzegovina